Jamie Hodari is an American entrepreneur. He is the founder and CEO of the flexible workplace provider Industrious.

Biography 
Hodari grew up in Bloomfield Hills, Michigan. He graduated from the Cranbrook Schools and received his B.A. from Columbia University, an M.P.P. from Harvard Kennedy School, and a J.D. from Yale Law School. Hodari worked as a reporter for The Times of India after learning Hindi and Urdu in college, then for the law firm Sullivan & Cromwell after law school and was an analyst at Birch Run Capital.

Hodari left finance to head a private college scholarship program for orphans of the Rwandan genocide called Generation Rwanda. He co-founded and served as CEO of Kepler, an experimental university tasked with bringing accessible higher education to Rwanda.

In 2012, Hodari co-founded Industrious with Justin Stewart, his next-door neighbor, who was then heading the U.S. arm of a Chinese Real Estate company. The two had similar unpleasant experiences in shared workspaces, which inspired them to start a premium flexible workplace company. The company has grown to over 500 employees over 100 locations in over 50 markets in the United States and worldwide as well as one of Inc. magazine's fastest growing companies in 2020.

In popular culture 
Hodari was played by Jordan Bridges in the 2022 miniseries WeCrashed.

Personal life 
Hodari lives in Fort Greene, Brooklyn.

References 

Year of birth missing (living people)
American company founders
The Times of India journalists
Columbia College (New York) alumni
Harvard Kennedy School alumni
Yale Law School alumni
Sullivan & Cromwell people
American chief executives
American real estate businesspeople
Cranbrook Educational Community alumni
People from Bloomfield Hills, Michigan
Living people